Lars Staffan Göthe (born 20 December 1944, in Luleå), is a Swedish playwright, actor and director. He is also a professor at Malmö Theatre Academy (Teaterhögskolan i Malmö) at Lund University.

He graduated from the Gothenburg Theatre Academy in 1971.

In 2001, he was awarded the Litteris et Artibus medal.

Plays by Göthe have been translated into English, German, Finnish and Estonian. His collected plays (22 out of the 23 works he had produced in the period 1971-2001) was published in 2003 as Lysande eländen (approx.: "Brilliant Miseries").

List of works

Plays

In English translation
A Stuffed Dog (Swedish: En uppstoppad hund; original from 1986, translation by Kim Dambæk) - Also filmed (in Swedish) by Sveriges Television in 2006 and broadcast late that year in the newly started high definition channel SVT HD.
One Night in February (Swedish: En natt i februari; original from 1972, translation by Eivor Martinus)
The Crying Policeman (Swedish: Den gråtande polisen; original from 1979, translation by Eivor Martinus)

Other
The English titles given are approximate translations.

Screenplay
Magic Stronger Than Life - (Swedish Kärlekens himmelska helvete, literally The Heavenly Hell of Love), 1993

Work as actor in film and television
Göthe has, starting with the mini-series Offside in 1971, appeared in several films and TV series, almost all of which are Swedish language productions (an exception is the Norwegian Ballen i øyet from 2000). These include, in addition to those already named (and some others): Agneta Fagerström-Olssons Magic Stronger Than Life (for which he also wrote the screenplay, as mentioned above); two episodes of the Anna Holt television series (1996); Beck – Spår i mörker (1997, part of the long series of TV movies with Peter Haber as Martin Beck); and My Bearded Mother (Swedish: Min skäggiga mamma), a 2003 short film directed by Maria Hedman that won a Guldbagge Award for best short film in 2004 as well as the Grand Prize of European Fantasy Short Film in Silver at Sweden Fantastic Film Festival in 2003.

References

External links 
 

20th-century Swedish dramatists and playwrights
1944 births
Living people
Litteris et Artibus recipients
Swedish male actors
Academic staff of Lund University
Swedish theatre directors
Swedish male dramatists and playwrights
People from Luleå
21st-century Swedish dramatists and playwrights